The 2011 German Masters was a professional ranking snooker tournament that took place between 2–6 February at the Tempodrom in Berlin, Germany.

The event was last held in 1998, but it was non-ranking. John Parrott won in the final 6–4 against Mark Williams.

Mark Williams won his 18th ranking title by defeating Mark Selby 9–7 in the final.

Prize fund
The breakdown of prize money for 2011 is shown below:

Winner: €50,000
Runner-up: €30,000
Semi-finalists: €15,000
Quarter-finalists: €9,000
Last 16: €6,000
Last 32: €3,750
Last 48: €1,500

Highest break: €2,000

Total: €280,000

Wildcard round
These matches were played in Berlin on 2 and 3 February 2011.

Main draw

Final

Qualifying
These matches were held between 14 and 17 December 2010 at the World Snooker Academy, Sheffield, England.

Round 1

Round 2

Round 3

Century breaks

Qualifying stage centuries

 133, 120  Mark Joyce
 130, 130, 113  Jamie Burnett
 130  Issara Kachaiwong
 127  Alan McManus
 126  Matthew Selt
 126  James Wattana
 121, 119  Andy Hicks
 121  Rod Lawler
 119  Matthew Stevens
 113  David Gilbert
 111  Simon Bedford
 107, 100  Liu Song

 106, 103  Anthony Hamilton
 105, 102  Dominic Dale
 105  Thanawat Thirapongpaiboon
 105  Steve Davis
 104  Dave Harold
 103  Anthony McGill
 101  Marco Fu
 101  David Morris
 100, 100  Jimmy Robertson
 100  Fergal O'Brien
 100  Jack Lisowski
 100  Tony Drago

Televised stage centuries

 143  John Higgins
 142  Ryan Day
 140  Andrew Higginson
 140  Graeme Dott
 130  Stephen Maguire
 127, 116, 104  Anthony Hamilton

 124, 118, 100  Ding Junhui
 122, 108, 105, 104  Mark Williams
 112  Joe Swail
 105  Mark Selby
 100  Joe Perry

Gallery

References

External links

2011
German Masters
Masters
February 2011 sports events in Europe
Sports competitions in Berlin